

The Klemm Kl 31 was a touring aircraft, developed in Germany in the early 1930s. It was a conventional, low-wing cantilever monoplane with four seats in an enclosed cabin. The fixed, tailskid undercarriage had divided mainwheel units. The fuselage was built from welded steel tube, while the wings were wooden. Some Kl 31s saw service with the Luftwaffe as training and liaison aircraft.

Operators

Luftwaffe

Royal Hungarian Air Force

Specifications

References
 
 
 

1930s German sport aircraft
Klemm aircraft
Low-wing aircraft
Aircraft first flown in 1931